Solokhi is a rural locality (a selo) in Belgorodsky District, Belgorod Oblast, Russia. The population was 638 as of 2010. There are 5 streets.

Geography 
Solokhi is located 27 km west of Maysky (the district's administrative centre) by road. Novoalexandrovka is the nearest rural locality.

References 

Rural localities in Belgorodsky District
Grayvoronsky Uyezd